"The Girl's Alright with Me" is a 1964 song recorded by The Temptations for the Gordy (Motown) label. The B-side to their Top 40 hit "I'll Be in Trouble", the song was also able to chart on its own, peaking at number 102 on Billboard Pop Charts. It was written by Eddie Kendricks, Norman Whitfield, and Eddie Holland, and produced by Whitfield. Whitfield would rerecord the song with his act The Undisputed Truth some ten years later for their album Down To Earth.

Cash Box described it as "an engaging, easy-beat thumper that the crew serves up in tempting style."

Personnel
 Lead vocals by Eddie Kendricks
 Background vocals by Melvin Franklin, Paul Williams, David Ruffin, and Otis Williams
 Instrumentation by The Funk Brothers

Chart history

References 

1964 songs
The Temptations songs
Songs written by Norman Whitfield
Songs written by Eddie Holland
Songs written by Eddie Kendricks
Song recordings produced by Norman Whitfield
Gordy Records singles